Route 20 is a council-supported bus route which operates between Ratho and Chesser, Scotland.

History 
The route has existed since 2014, when Ratho lost its direct bus route into Edinburgh city centre.

On 31 August 2020, the route transferred from Lothian Buses to First Scotland East. As part of the change, the route was re-extended from Hermiston Gait to Chesser and a stop at Ingliston Park and Ride was added. The service operated at an hourly frequency. The change led to increased fares for passengers changing on to the tram, as the bus and tram are now operated by different companies.

In July 2022, First Bus announced that it planned to withdraw the route along with two others. The company blamed driver shortages. On 1 September 2022, it was announced that the services would continue to run for another year. However, the frequency was reduced with the number of buses per day cut from 30 to 16.

Route 

 Ratho
 Ratho Station
 Ingliston Park and Ride
 The Gyle Shopping Centre
 Edinburgh Park railway station (for Edinburgh Trams)
 Kingsknowe
 Longstone
 Chesser

References 

Bus routes in Scotland